In Greek mythology, Metanira (Ancient Greek: Μετάνειρα Metáneira) or Meganira was a queen of Eleusis as wife of King Celeus. She was the daughter of Amphictyon, the king of Athens.

Mythology 
While Demeter was searching for her daughter, having taken the form of an old woman called Doso, she received a hospitable welcome from Celeus, the King of Eleusis in Attica. He asked her to nurse Demophoon, his son by Metanira.  As a gift to Celeus, because of his hospitality, Demeter planned to make Demophoon immortal by burning his mortal spirit away in the family hearth every night. She was unable to complete the ritual because Metanira walked in on her one night and screamed at seeing her child in flames, which distracted the goddess. Some theories suggested that Demophoon, as a result, was destroyed by the flames, but in other sources he suffered no harm. 

In Ovid's Fasti, the baby was Triptolemus and not Demophoon, although in most other versions he was an adult by the time; some sources state that even his parentage was different. However, all versions agree that Demeter chose to teach Triptolemus the art of agriculture and, from him, the rest of Greece learned to plant and reap crops. He flew across the land on a winged chariot while Demeter and Persephone cared for him, and helped him complete his mission of educating the whole of Greece on the art of agriculture. Some mythological traditions tell that Metanira's son Abas mocked Demeter and as punishment was turned into a lizard; others, however, relate this of Ascalabus, son of Misme.

Notes

References 

 Antoninus Liberalis, The Metamorphoses of Antoninus Liberalis translated by Francis Celoria (Routledge 1992). Online version at the Topos Text Project.
 Apollodorus, The Library with an English Translation by Sir James George Frazer, F.B.A., F.R.S. in 2 Volumes, Cambridge, MA, Harvard University Press; London, William Heinemann Ltd. 1921. . Online version at the Perseus Digital Library. Greek text available from the same website.
Gaius Julius Hyginus, Fabulae from The Myths of Hyginus translated and edited by Mary Grant. University of Kansas Publications in Humanistic Studies. Online version at the Topos Text Project.
 Pausanias, Description of Greece with an English Translation by W.H.S. Jones, Litt.D., and H.A. Ormerod, M.A., in 4 Volumes. Cambridge, MA, Harvard University Press; London, William Heinemann Ltd. 1918. . Online version at the Perseus Digital Library
 Pausanias, Graeciae Descriptio. 3 vols. Leipzig, Teubner. 1903.  Greek text available at the Perseus Digital Library.
 Publius Ovidius Naso, Metamorphoses translated by Brookes More (1859-1942). Boston, Cornhill Publishing Co. 1922. Online version at the Perseus Digital Library.
 Publius Ovidius Naso, Metamorphoses. Hugo Magnus. Gotha (Germany). Friedr. Andr. Perthes. 1892. Latin text available at the Perseus Digital Library.
 The Homeric Hymns and Homerica with an English Translation by Hugh G. Evelyn-White. Homeric Hymns. Cambridge, MA.,Harvard University Press; London, William Heinemann Ltd. 1914. Online version at the Perseus Digital Library. Greek text available from the same website.

External links
 "Pentelic Fragment," a poem about Metaneira by Jared Carter.
Queens in Greek mythology

Eleusinian characters in Greek mythology
Deeds of Demeter